Imanol Javier Machuca (born 15 January 2000) is an Argentine professional footballer who plays as an attacking midfielder for Unión Santa Fe.

Career
Machuca started his career in Roldán with San Lorenzo. Spells soon followed with El Porvenir del Norte and Sportivo Matienzo, which preceded him joining the system of Talleres. In 2018, after a trial with Vélez Sarsfield, Machuca completed a move to Unión Santa Fe. After two years in the reserves, he was promoted into the first-team squad in October 2020 under manager Juan Manuel Azconzábal; penning pro terms on 28 October. Machuca made his senior debut on 29 October during a Copa Sudamericana second stage first leg home defeat to Emelec, as he replaced Juan Manuel García with two minutes left.

Career statistics
.

Notes

References

External links

2000 births
Living people
People from San Lorenzo Department
Argentine footballers
Association football midfielders
Argentine Primera División players
Unión de Santa Fe footballers
Sportspeople from Santa Fe Province